Pauline "Polly" Adams (born 27 August 1939) is an English actress best known for her work on the stage both in England and in the United States, and for her portrayal of Mrs. Brown on the television series Just William.

She made her Broadway debut in a 1975 revival of London Assurance as Grace Harkaway. For her portrayal she was nominated for a Drama Desk Award. Her other Broadway credits include Bedroom Farce.

Life and career
Adams was born in Chichester, Sussex. She trained at Royal Academy of Dramatic Art (RADA) and has appeared in several productions on the London Stage appearing at such theatres as the Old Vic, the Oxford Stage Company, the Hampstead Theatre, the Royal National Theatre, the Greenwich Theatre, the Haymarket Theatre, the Lyric Hammersmith, the Globe Theatre, the Queen's Theatre, the Piccadilly Theatre, the Savoy Theatre and the Royal Shakespeare Company among others.

Her theatre credits include Ida in The Chiltern Hundreds, Time and the Conways, A Month in the Country, Pygmalion, Tis Pity She’s a Whore, A Small Family Business, Tons of Money, Plunder, The Philanderer, Engaged, Troilus and Cressida and Don Juan Comes Back From The War, The Government Inspector, Benefactors, The Real Thing, Present Laughter, The Importance of Being Earnest, Hay Fever, The Merchant of Venice, Private Lives, The Complaisant Lover, and Relatively Speaking, among several others.

Adams worked on television in the United Kingdom, appearing in programmes including The Ruth Rendell Mysteries, Element of Doubt, Just William, A Dark-Adapted Eye, The Cinder Path, Blisters , Inspector Alleyn, Bonjour la Classe, The Camomile Lawn, Sob Sisters, Executive Stress, The Murder at the Vicarage, Faint-Hearted Feminist, Winter Sunshine, Goodbye Darling , Tribute to the Lady, Upstairs, Downstairs, The First Churchills, The Spoils of Poynton, Pride and Prejudice, and Compact and Sea Song. Her film credits include Kisna and A Woman of the North.

Personal life
Her daughters, Susannah, Nelly, and Caroline Harker are also actresses. Adams portrayed Jane Bennet in the 1967 television adaptation of Pride and Prejudice, while Susannah Harker played the same role in the 1995 TV series Pride and Prejudice.

Filmography

Film

Television

Theatre

References

External links

Time Magazine, December 30, 1974

1939 births
Living people
Actresses from Sussex
Alumni of RADA
English film actresses
English stage actresses
English television actresses
Harker family
People from Chichester
People from West Itchenor